Ronald Michael Green is an American theologian, currently Eunice and Julian Cohen Professor Emeritus for the Study of Ethics and Human Values Professor at Dartmouth College.  Green graduated from Brown University before his Ph.D. in Religious Ethics at Harvard University.

References

Year of birth missing (living people)
Living people
Dartmouth College faculty
American theologians
Brown University alumni
Harvard Graduate School of Arts and Sciences alumni